Below is a list of current team squads that compete in the Super League of England and France.

Castleford Tigers

Catalans Dragons

Huddersfield Giants

Hull FC

Hull Kingston Rovers

Leeds Rhinos

Leigh Leopards

Salford Red Devils

St. Helens

Wakefield Trinity

Warrington Wolves

Wigan Warriors

References

team squads
SL team squads
Super League